Carroll Burleigh Colby (September 7, 1904 – October 31, 1977) was an American writer, primarily of nonfiction children's books. He wrote more than 100 books that were widely circulated in public and school libraries in the United States. He is best known for Strangely Enough! (1959).

Biography

Early life 
Colby was born in Claremont, New Hampshire, graduated from Stevens High School in 1922, and then attended the School of Practical Art in Boston, where he graduated in 1925.

He sailed to Puerto Rico with the intention of being a free-lance artist, but his failure led him to join the U.S. Customs Service during the Prohibition era.  He married Lila Thoday in November 1928, having two children, Fred and Susan M. Colby.

Writing career 
Colby sold his first fiction story in 1929.

Learning to fly glider aircraft in 1931, Colby began writing and illustrating articles for various aviation magazines, becoming an editor of Air Trails and Air Progress magazines that were Street & Smith publications.  He co-authored the Junior Birdmen Standard Aviation Dictionary for the Junior Birdmen of America. In 1943 he became aviation editor of Popular Science magazine and became a war correspondent with the U.S. Army Air Forces in Newfoundland, Labrador, and Alaska.  He left the magazine in 1946 to free-lance articles. Colby enlisted and served as an officer with the Civil Air Patrol.

Colby's first book was early in 1951 as by "Carroll Colby": Gabbit, the Magic Rabbit, a self-illustrated picture book about a magician's rabbit who turns the tables. He began his non-fiction book writing with Our Fighting Jets in 1951.  He specialized in outdoor subjects such as hunting, fishing, camping, and firearms.  Many of his books were about military and public safety organizations or new technology, designed to be understood by children.

In 1959 Colby wrote his most popular book, Strangely Enough!, a collection of short non-fiction narrative about true life adventure, paranormal mysteries, UFOs, and other unusual events.

Selected works  

 Gabbit, the Magic Rabbit (Coward-McCann, 1951), self-illustrated, 
 Art and Science of Taking to the Woods
 Firing Line! Weapons, Vehicles, Rockets, and Research (Coward-McCann, 1957)
 Bomber Parade: Headliners in Bomber Plane History (Coward-McCann, 1960)
 Historic American Forts: From Frontier Stockade to Coastal Fortress (Coward-McCann, 1963)
 Chute!: Air Drop for Defense and Sport
 Submarine Warfare: Men, Weapons, and Ships (Coward-McCann, 1967)
 FBI: The G-Mens' Weapons and Tactics For Combat
 Six-shooter: Pistols, Revolvers, And Automatics, Past And Present
 Strangely Enough!
 Jets of the World: New Fighters, Bombers and Transports
 Fighter Parade: Headliners in Fighter Plane History
 First Rifle: How to Shoot It Straight and Use It Safe
 Musket to M-14 Pistols, Rifles and Machine Guns
 Leatherneck: The Training, Weapons and Equipment of the United States Marine Corps
 Fighting Gear of World War II Equipment and Weapons of the American G.I.
 The Weirdest People in the World
 World's Best True Ghost Stories
 World's Best Lost Treasure Stories
 Arms of our Fighting Men: Personal Weapons, Bazookas, Big Guns (revised edition: Coward, McCann & Geoghegan, 1972)
 Two Centuries of Weapons, 1776-1976 (Coward, McCann & Geoghegan, 1975)
 Two Centuries of Seapower, 1776-1976 (Coward, McCann & Geoghegan, 1976)

Notes

References

External links 

 

1904 births
1977 deaths
20th-century American non-fiction writers
American UFO writers
American military writers
American technology writers
American children's writers
American fortean writers
Children's non-fiction writers
Parapsychologists
People from Briarcliff Manor, New York
Writers from New Hampshire